A SIMM (single in-line memory module) is a type of memory module containing random-access memory used in computers from the early 1980s to the early 2000s. It differs from a dual in-line memory module (DIMM), the most predominant form of memory module since the late 1990s, in that the contacts on a SIMM are redundant on both sides of the module. SIMMs were standardised under the JEDEC JESD-21C standard.

Most early PC motherboards (8088-based PCs, XTs, and early ATs) used socketed DIP chips for DRAM. As computer memory capacities grew, memory modules were used to save motherboard space and ease memory expansion. Instead of plugging in eight or nine single DIP chips, only one additional memory module was needed to increase the memory of the computer.

History
SIMMs were invented in 1982 by James J. Parker at Zenith Microcircuits and the first Zenith Microcircuits customer was Wang Laboratories.  Wang Laboratories tried to patent it and were granted a patent in April 1987.  That patent was later voided when Wang Laboratories sued multiple companies for infringement and it was then publicized that they were the prior invention of Parker at Zenith Microcircuits (the Elk Grove Village, Illinois subsidiary of Zenith Electronics Corporation). The lawsuit was then dropped and the patent was vacated. The original memory modules were built upon ceramic substrates with 64K Hitachi "flip chip" parts and had pins, i.e. single in-line package (SIP) packaging. There was an 8-bit part and a 9-bit part both at 64K. The pins were the costliest part of the assembly process and Zenith Microcircuits, in conjunction with Wang and Amp, soon developed an easy insertion, pinless connector. Later the modules were built on ceramic substrates with Fujitsu plastic J-lead chips and still later, they were made on standard PCB material.  SIMMs using pins are usually called SIP or SIPP memory modules to distinguish them from the more common modules using edge connectors.

The first variant of SIMMs has 30 pins and provides 8 bits of data (plus a 9th error-detection bit in parity SIMMs). They were used in AT-compatible (286-based, e.g., Wang APC), 386-based, 486-based, Macintosh Plus, Macintosh II, Quadra, Atari STE microcomputers, Wang VS minicomputers and Roland electronic samplers.

The second variant of SIMMs has 72 pins and provides 32 bits of data (36 bits in parity and ECC versions). These appeared first in the early 1990s in later models of the IBM PS/2, and later in systems based on the 486, Pentium, Pentium Pro, early Pentium II, and contemporary/competing chips of other brands. By the mid-90s, 72-pin SIMMs had replaced 30-pin SIMMs in new-build computers, and were starting to themselves be replaced by DIMMs.

Non-IBM PC computers such as UNIX workstations may use proprietary non-standard SIMMs. The Macintosh IIfx uses proprietary non-standard SIMMs with 64 pins.

DRAM technologies used in SIMMs include FPM (Fast Page Mode memory, used in all 30-pin and early 72-pin modules), and the higher-performance EDO DRAM (used in later 72-pin modules).

Due to the differing data bus widths of the memory modules and some processors, sometimes several modules must be installed in identical pairs or in identical groups of four to fill a memory bank. The rule of thumb is a 286, 386SX, 68000 or low-end 68020 / 68030 (e.g. Atari Falcon, Mac LC) system (using a 16 bit wide data bus) would require two 30-pin SIMMs for a memory bank. On 386DX, 486, and full-spec 68020 through 68060 (e.g. Atari TT, Amiga 4000, Mac II) systems (32 bit data bus), either four 30-pin SIMMs or one 72-pin SIMM are required for one memory bank. On Pentium systems (data bus width of 64 bits), two 72-pin SIMMs are required. However, some Pentium systems have support for a "half bank mode", in which the data bus would be shortened to only 32 bits to allow operation of a single SIMM. Conversely, some 386 and 486 systems use what is known as "memory interleaving", which requires twice as many SIMMs and effectively doubles the bandwidth.

The earliest SIMM sockets were conventional push-type sockets. These were soon replaced by ZIF sockets in which the SIMM was inserted at an angle, then tilted into an upright position. To remove one, the two metal or plastic clips at each end must be pulled to the side, then the SIMM must be tilted back and pulled out (low-profile sockets reversed this convention somewhat, like SODIMMs - the modules are inserted at a "high" angle, then pushed down to become more flush with the motherboard). The earlier sockets used plastic retainer clips which were found to break, so steel clips replaced them.

Some SIMMs support presence detect (PD). Connections are made to some of the pins that encode the capacity and speed of the SIMM, so that compatible equipment can detect the properties of the SIMM. PD SIMMs can be used in equipment which does not support PD; the information is ignored. Standard SIMMs can easily be converted to support PD by fitting jumpers, if the SIMMs have solder pads to do so, or by soldering wires on.

30-pin SIMMs

Standard sizes: 256 KB, 1 MB, 4 MB, 16 MB

30-pin SIMMS have 12 address lines, which can provide a total of 24 address bits. With an 8 bit data width, this leads to an absolute maximum capacity of 16 MB for both parity and non-parity modules (the additional redundancy bit chip usually does not contribute to the usable capacity).

* Pins 26, 28 and 29 are not connected on non-parity SIMMs.

72-pin SIMMs

Standard sizes: 1 MB, 2 MB, 4 MB, 8 MB, 16 MB, 32 MB, 64 MB, 128 MB (the standard also defines 3.3 V modules with additional address lines and up to 2 GB)

With 12 address lines, which can provide a total of 24 address bits, two ranks of chips, and 32 bit data output, the absolute maximum capacity is 227 = 128 MB.

* Pins 35, 36, 37 and 38 are not connected on non-parity SIMMs.

†/RAS1 and /RAS3 are only used on two-rank SIMMS: 2, 8, 32, and 128 MB.

# These lines are only defined on 3.3V modules.

x Presence Detect signals are detailed in JEDEC Standard.

Proprietary SIMMs

GVP 64-pin
Several CPU cards from Great Valley Products for the Commodore Amiga used special 64-pin SIMMs (32 bits wide, 1, 4 or 16 MB, 60 ns).

Apple 64-pin
Dual-ported 64-pin SIMMs were used in Apple Macintosh IIfx computers to allow overlapping read/write cycles (1, 4, 8, 16 MB, 80 ns).

HP LaserJet
72-pin SIMMs with non-standard Presence Detect (PD) connections.

See also
Dual in-line package (DIP)
Single in-line package (SIP)
Zig-zag in-line package (ZIP)
Dual in-line memory module (DIMM)

References

External links

General SIMM Installation Guide

Computer memory form factor